is a railway station in the town of Tsubata, Kahoku District, Ishikawa, Japan, jointly operated by West Japan Railway Company (JR West) and the third-sector railway operator IR Ishikawa Railway.

Lines

Through trains to and from the Ainokaze Toyama Railway Line also operate over this line.

Layout
The station consists of two island platforms serving four tracks, connected by a footbridge. The station has a Midori no Madoguchi staffed ticket office.

Platforms

Adjacent stations

History
The station opened on 1 November 1898. With the privatization of Japanese National Railways (JNR) on 1 April 1987, the station came under the control of JR West. From this date, Tsubata Station was transferred to the ownership of the third-sector operating company IR Ishikawa Railway.

Surrounding area

National Institute of Technology, Ishikawa College
Chujo Elementary School

Passenger statistics
In fiscal 2015, the station was used by an average of 5,130 passengers daily (boarding passengers only).

See also
 List of railway stations in Japan

References

External links

 JR West station information 
 IR Ishikawa Railway station information 

Railway stations in Ishikawa Prefecture
Stations of West Japan Railway Company
Railway stations in Japan opened in 1898
IR Ishikawa Railway Line
Nanao Line
Tsubata, Ishikawa